Leicester City Football Club is an English professional football club based in Leicester in the East Midlands of England. The club competes in the Premier League, the highest level of England's football league system, and plays its home matches at King Power Stadium.

The club was founded in 1884 as Leicester Fosse F.C, playing on a field near Fosse Road. They moved to Filbert Street in 1891, were elected to the Football League in 1894 and adopted the name Leicester City in 1919. They moved to the nearby Walkers Stadium in 2002, which was renamed King Power Stadium in 2011.

Leicester won the 2015–16 Premier League, becoming one of seven clubs to have won the Premier League since its inception in 1992. The title win was widely considered a 'footballing fairytale' and subsequently attracted global attention. Their previous highest ever league finish was second place in the top flight, in 1928–29, then known as the First Division. Leicester have seven second-tier titles to their name, a joint record at this level of English football.

The club have competed in the FA Cup final five times, winning their first title in 2021. The club have also won the League Cup three times in 1964, 1997 and 2000. Leicester have played in seven European competitions to date, notably reaching the UEFA Champions League quarter-finals in 2016–17 and UEFA Europa Conference League semi-finals in 2021–22.

History

Founding and early years (1884–1949)
Formed in 1884 by a group of old boys of Wyggeston School as "Leicester Fosse", the club joined The Football Association (FA) in 1890. Before moving to Filbert Street in 1891, the club played at five different grounds, including Victoria Park south-east of the city centre and the Belgrave Road Cycle and Cricket Ground. The club also joined the Midland League in 1891, and were elected to Division Two of the Football League in 1894 after finishing second. Leicester's first ever Football League game was a 4–3 defeat at Grimsby Town, with a first League win the following week, against Rotherham United at Filbert Street. The same season also saw the club's largest win to date, a 13–0 victory over Notts Olympic in an FA Cup qualifying game. In 1907–08 the club finished as Second Division runners-up, gaining promotion to the First Division, the highest level of English football. However, the club were relegated after a single season which included the club's record defeat, a 12–0 loss against Nottingham Forest.

In 1919, when league football resumed after World War I, Leicester Fosse ceased trading due to financial difficulties. The club was reformed as "Leicester City Football Club", particularly appropriate as the borough of Leicester had recently been given city status. Following the name change, the club enjoyed moderate success in the 1920s; under the management of Peter Hodge, who left in May 1926 to be replaced two months later by Willie Orr, and with record goalscorer Arthur Chandler in the side, they won the Division Two title in 1924–25 and recorded their second-highest league finish in 1928–29 as runners-up by a single point to The Wednesday. However the 1930s saw a downturn in fortunes, with the club relegated in 1934–35 and, after promotion in 1936–37, another relegation in 1938–39 would see them finish the decade in Division Two.

Post-World War II (1949–2000)
Leicester reached the FA Cup final for the first time in their history in 1949, losing 3–1 to Wolverhampton Wanderers. The club, however, was celebrating a week later when a draw on the last day of the season ensured survival in Division Two. Leicester won the Division Two championship in 1954, with the help of Arthur Rowley, one of the club's most prolific strikers. Although they were relegated from Division One the next season, under Dave Halliday they returned in 1957, with Rowley scoring a club record 44 goals in one season. Leicester remained in Division One until 1969, their longest period ever in the top flight.

Under the management of Matt Gillies and his assistant Bert Johnson, Leicester reached the FA Cup final on another two occasions, but lost in both 1961 and 1963. As they lost to double winners Tottenham Hotspur in 1961, they were England's representatives in the 1961–62 European Cup Winners' Cup. In the 1962–63 season, the club led the First Division during the winter. Thanks to a sensational run of form on icy and frozen pitches, the team became nicknamed the "Ice Kings" and eventually finished fourth, the club's best post-war finish. Gillies guided Leicester to their first piece of silverware in 1964, when Leicester beat Stoke City 4–3 on aggregate to win the League Cup for the first time. Leicester also reached the League Cup final the following year but lost 3–2 on aggregate to Chelsea. Gillies and Johnson received praise for their version of the "whirl" and the "switch" system, a system that had previously been used by the Austrian and Hungarian national teams. After a bad start to the season, Matt Gillies resigned in November 1968. His successor, Frank O'Farrell was unable to prevent relegation, but the club reached the FA Cup final in 1969, losing to Manchester City 1–0.

In 1971, Leicester were promoted back to the First Division, and won the Charity Shield for the first time. Due to double winners Arsenal's commitments in European competition, Second Division winners Leicester were invited to play FA Cup runners-up Liverpool, beating them 1–0 thanks to a goal by Steve Whitworth. Jimmy Bloomfield was appointed for the new season, and his team remained in the First Division for his tenure. Leicester reached the FA Cup semi-final in 1973–74.

Frank McLintock, a noted player for seven years for Leicester in a successful period from the late 1950s to the mid 1960s, succeeded Bloomfield in 1977. City were relegated at the end of the 1977–78 season and McLintock resigned. Jock Wallace resumed the tradition of successful Scottish managers (after Peter Hodge and Matt Gillies) by steering Leicester to the Second Division championship in 1980. Wallace was unable to keep Leicester in the First Division, but they reached the FA Cup semi-final in 1982. Under Wallace, one of City's most famous home-grown players, Gary Lineker, emerged into the first team squad. Leicester's next manager was Gordon Milne, who achieved promotion in 1983. Lineker helped Leicester maintain their place in the First Division but was sold to Everton in 1985 and two years later Leicester were relegated, having failed to find a suitable replacement to partner Alan Smith, who was sold to Arsenal after Leicester went down.

Milne left in 1986 and was replaced in 1987 by David Pleat, who was sacked in January 1991 with Leicester in danger of relegation to the Third Division. Gordon Lee was put in charge of the club until the end of the season. Leicester won their final game of the season, which guided them clear of relegation to the third tier of the Football League.

Brian Little took over in 1991 and by the end of the 1991–92 season Leicester had reached the playoff final for a place in the new Premier League, but lost to Blackburn Rovers and a penalty from former Leicester striker Mike Newell. The club also reached the playoff final the following year, losing 4–3 to Swindon Town, having come back from 3–0 down. In 1993–94 City were promoted from the playoffs, beating Derby County 2–1 in the final. Little quit as Leicester manager the following November to take charge at Aston Villa, and his successor Mark McGhee was unable to save Leicester from finishing second from bottom in the 1994–95 season.

McGhee left the club unexpectedly in December 1995 while Leicester were top of the First Division to take charge of Wolverhampton Wanderers. McGhee was replaced by Martin O'Neill. Under O'Neill, Leicester qualified for the 1996 Football League play-offs and beat Crystal Palace 2–1 in the final through a 120th minute Steve Claridge goal to gain promotion to the Premier League. Following promotion, Leicester established themselves in the Premier League with four successive top ten finishes. O'Neill ended Leicester's 33-year wait for a major trophy, winning the League Cup twice, in 1997 and 2000, and Leicester were runners-up in 1999. Thus, the club qualified for the UEFA Cup in 1997–98 and 2000–01, the club's first European competition since 1961. In June 2000, O'Neill left Leicester City to take over as manager of Celtic.

Decline in the early 21st century (2000–2008) 
O'Neill was replaced by former England under-21 coach Peter Taylor. During this time, one of Leicester's European appearances ended in a 3–1 defeat to Red Star Belgrade on 28 September 2000 in the UEFA Cup. Leicester began well under Taylor's management, topping the Premier League for two weeks in the autumn and remaining in contention for a European place for most of the campaign, before a late season collapse dragged them down to a 13th-place finish.

Taylor was sacked after a poor start to the 2001–02 season, and his successor Dave Bassett lasted just six months before being succeeded by his assistant Micky Adams, the change of management being announced just before relegation was confirmed. Leicester won just five league matches all season.

Leicester moved into the new 32,314-seat Walkers Stadium at the start of the 2002–03 season, ending 111 years at Filbert Street. Walkers, the Leicestershire-based crisp manufacturers, acquired the naming rights for a ten-year period. In October 2002, the club went into administration with debts of £30 million. Some of the reasons were the loss of TV money (ITV Digital, itself in administration, had promised money to First Division clubs for TV rights), the large wage bill, lower than expected fees for players transferred to other clubs and the £37 million cost of the new stadium. Adams was banned from the transfer market for most of the season, even after the club was rescued with a takeover by a consortium led by Gary Lineker. Adams guided Leicester to the runners-up spot in Division One and automatic promotion back to the Premier League with more than 90 points. However, Leicester lasted only one season in the top flight and were relegated to the newly labelled Championship, previously known as Division One.

When Adams resigned as manager in October 2004, Craig Levein was appointed boss. This would prove to be an unsuccessful period and after 15 months in charge, Levein was sacked, having failed to get The Foxes anywhere near the promotion places. Assistant manager Rob Kelly took over as caretaker manager, and after winning three out of four matches, was appointed to see out the rest of the season. Kelly steered Leicester to safety and in April 2006 was given the manager's job on a permanent basis.

In October 2006, ex-Portsmouth chairman Milan Mandarić was quoted as saying he was interested in buying the club, reportedly at a price of around £6 million, with the current playing squad valued at roughly £4.2 million. The takeover was formally announced on 13 February 2007. On 11 April 2007, Rob Kelly was sacked as manager and Nigel Worthington appointed as caretaker manager until the end of the season. Worthington saved the club from relegation, but was not offered the job on a permanent basis. On 25 May 2007, the club announced former Milton Keynes Dons manager Martin Allen as their new manager with a three-year contract. Allen's relationship with Mandarić became tense and after only four matches, Allen left by mutual consent on 29 August 2007. On 13 September 2007, Mandarić announced Gary Megson as the new manager of the club, citing Megson's "wealth of experience" as a deciding factor in the appointment. However, Megson left on 24 October 2007 after only six weeks in charge, following an approach made for his services by Bolton Wanderers. Mandarić placed Frank Burrows and Gerry Taggart in the shared position as caretaker managers until a professional manager was appointed.

On 22 November, Ian Holloway was appointed manager, and he became the first Leicester manager in over 50 years to win his first league match in charge, beating Bristol City 2–0. However, this success did not last, and Leicester were relegated from the Championship at the end of the 2007–08 season. Holloway left by mutual consent after less than a season at the club, being replaced by Nigel Pearson.

Third tier to Premier League and new ownership (2008–2015)
The 2008–09 campaign was Leicester's first season outside the top two levels of English football, but they hit this nadir only seven years before becoming the 2015–16 Premier League champions – one of the fastest ever rises to the top of the English football league system. Following relegation to the third tier the previous season, Leicester returned to the Championship at the first attempt in 2008–09, finishing as champions of League One after a 2–0 win at Southend United, with two matches in hand. The 2009–10 season saw Leicester's revival under manager Nigel Pearson continue, as the club finished fifth and reached the Championship play-offs in their first season back in the second tier. Though coming from 2–0 down on aggregate, away to Cardiff City, to briefly lead 3–2, they eventually lost to a penalty shoot-out in the play-off semi-final. At the end of the season, Pearson left Leicester to become the manager of Hull City, claiming he felt the club seemed reluctant to keep him, and that Paulo Sousa had been the club's guest at both play-off games, hinting at a possible replacement. On 7 July 2010, Sousa was confirmed as Pearson's replacement.

In August 2010, following agreement on a three-year shirt sponsorship deal with duty-free retailers the King Power Group, Mandarić sold the club to Thai-led consortium Asian Football Investments (AFI), fronted by King Power Group's Vichai and his son Aiyawatt Srivaddhanaprabha. Mandarić, an investor in AFI, was retained as club chairman. On 1 October 2010, after a poor start that saw Leicester bottom of the Championship with only one win out of the first nine league matches, Paulo Sousa was sacked by the club with immediate effect. Two days later, Sven-Göran Eriksson, who had been approached by the club after the 6–1 loss to then bottom-of-the-table Portsmouth two weeks earlier, was appointed as his replacement, signing a two-year contract with the club. On 10 February 2011, Vichai, part of the Thai-based Asia Football Investments consortium, was appointed new chairman of the club after Mandarić left in November to take over Sheffield Wednesday.

Leicester were viewed as one of the favourites for promotion in the 2011–12 season, but on 24 October 2011, following an inconsistent start with the Foxes winning just 5 out of their first 13 matches, Eriksson left the club by mutual consent. Three weeks later, Nigel Pearson returned to the club as Eriksson's successor. Pearson would go on to lead The Foxes to a sixth-place finish in the 2012–13 season, ensuring Leicester were in the Championship play-offs. However, Leicester lost the playoff semi-final 3–2 on aggregate to Watford after Anthony Knockaert missed a late penalty and Troy Deeney scored right at the end after a swift counterattack from a Manuel Almunia double save.

In 2014, Leicester's march up the league system hit a breakthrough. Their 2–1 home win over Sheffield Wednesday, combined with losses by Queens Park Rangers and Derby County, allowed Leicester City to clinch promotion to the Premier League after a ten-year absence. Later that month, a win at Bolton Wanderers saw Leicester become champions of the 2013–14 Championship. This was their seventh second tier title, which is currently a joint record.

Leicester started their first season in the Premier League since 2004 with a good run of results in their first five league matches, starting with a 2–2 draw on the opening day against Everton. The Foxes then claimed their first Premier League win since May 2004, with a 1–0 win at Stoke City. On 21 September 2014, Leicester went on to produce one of the greatest comebacks in Premier League history, beating Manchester United 5–3 at King Power Stadium. They made Premier League history by becoming the first team to beat Manchester United from a two-goal deficit since the league's launch in 1992.

During the 2014–15 season, a dismal run of form saw the team slip to the bottom of the league table with only 19 points from 29 matches. By 3 April 2015, they were seven points adrift from safety. This could have brought a sudden end to Leicester's seven-year rise, but seven wins from their final nine league matches meant The Foxes finished the season in 14th place with 41 points. They finished the season with a 5–1 thrashing of relegated Queens Park Rangers, and Leicester's upturn in results was described as one of the Premier League's greatest ever escapes from relegation. They also became only the third team in Premier League history to survive after being bottom at Christmas (the other two being West Bromwich Albion in 2005 and Sunderland in 2014), and no team with fewer than 20 points from 29 matches had previously stayed up.

Premier League champions (2015–16)

On 30 June 2015, Nigel Pearson was sacked, with the club stating "the working relationship is no longer viable." The sacking was linked to a number of public relations issues involving Pearson throughout the season, with the final straw involving his son James' role in a "racist sex tape" made by three Leicester reserve players in Thailand during a post-season goodwill tour. Leicester reacted by appointing former Chelsea manager Claudio Ranieri as their new manager for the new 2015–16 Premier League season. Despite an initially sceptical reaction to Ranieri's appointment, the club made an exceptional start to the season. Striker Jamie Vardy scored 13 goals over 11 consecutive matches from August to November, breaking Ruud van Nistelrooy's Premier League record of scoring in 10 consecutive matches. On 19 December, Leicester defeated Everton 3–2 at Goodison Park to top the Premier League on Christmas Day, having been bottom exactly 12 months earlier. A 2–0 victory at Sunderland on 10 April, coupled with Tottenham Hotspur's 3–0 win over Manchester United, ensured Leicester's qualification for the UEFA Champions League for the first time in their history.

Leicester won the Premier League on 2 May 2016 after Tottenham lost a 2–0 lead against Chelsea, drawing 2–2 at the "Battle of Stamford Bridge". Bookmakers thought Leicester's victory was so unlikely that Ladbrokes and William Hill offered odds of 5,000–1 for it at the start of the season, which subsequently resulted in the largest payout in British sporting history with total winnings of £25 million. A number of newspapers described Leicester's title win as the greatest sporting shock ever; multiple bookmakers including Ladbrokes and William Hill had never paid out at such long odds for any sport. As a result of the title win, the team was dubbed "The Unbelievables", a spin-off harking back to Arsenal's undefeated team "The Invincibles". The scale of the surprise attracted global attention for the club and the city of Leicester. The Economist declared it would be "pored over for management lessons". Several commentators viewed it as an inspiration to other clubs and fundamentally transforming the expectations faced in English football.

Leicester became known for their counterattacking style of play, "incredible pace in the areas it is most essential" and defensive solidarity. Former boss Nigel Pearson was credited by pundits and fans as having laid the foundations for Leicester's title winning season. Reacting to the title win, then executive chairman of the Premier League Richard Scudamore said:

 A film has been planned on the story, centering around Jamie Vardy.

Post Premier League title win (2016–present)
Leicester, while performing well in the UEFA Champions League, struggled domestically during 2016–17, spending much of the first few months in the bottom half of the Premier League table. In December 2016, Ranieri was awarded coach of the year and Leicester team of the year at the BBC Sports Personality of the Year. However, on 23 February 2017, Ranieri was dismissed due to the club's continuing poor form, resulting in them being only one point above the relegation zone. The sacking was met with significant upset and anger from sections of the media, with Gary Lineker calling the sacking "very sad" and "inexplicable", while then Manchester United manager José Mourinho blamed it on "selfish players". Rumours began emerging some days later that players had been meeting with the owners to discuss Ranieri's sacking without Ranieri knowing, which sparked widespread outrage over social media, but these were never proven. Craig Shakespeare took over as caretaker manager, and in his first match in charge, Leicester won 3–1 against 5th placed Liverpool. In his second match as caretaker, Shakespeare led Leicester to another 3–1 victory over Hull City. Following those two results, it was decided on 12 March 2017 that Shakespeare would become manager until the end of the season.

The 2016–17 campaign was also the first season in 15 years that Leicester qualified for European football. Leicester were placed in Group G of the 2016–17 UEFA Champions League, alongside Porto, Copenhagen and Club Brugge. In their inaugural Champions League campaign, they went undefeated in their first five matches to progress to the knockout stages as group winners. The Foxes then faced La Liga club Sevilla in the round of 16 and defeated the Spanish side 2–0 on the night, and 3–2 on aggregate to advance to the quarter-finals. There they faced Atlético Madrid, and drew 1–1 in the second leg, but lost 2–1 on aggregate after losing 1–0 in the first leg. This put an end to Leicester's 2016–17 European campaign, and they finished as Champions League quarter-finalists. Despite the loss, Leicester remained unbeaten at home in the 2016–17 Champions League.

Craig Shakespeare, having impressed during his caretaker spell, was appointed full-time on a three-year contract. However, following a poor start to the season he was sacked in October 2017 after four months officially in charge, with Leicester in 18th place in the table.
 He was replaced with former Southampton boss Claude Puel on 25 October 2017. By Christmas, Leicester were in 8th position in the Premier League and went on to finish one place lower in 9th at the end of the season. Despite rumours that Puel would leave, he remained at the club for the next season and performed well. However, the team suffered a poor run of games in 2019 which saw Leicester suffer 4 successive home defeats, and following a 4–1 home defeat to Crystal Palace, Puel was sacked on 24 February 2019 with the club in 12th place. Two days later on 26 February 2019, former Liverpool manager Brendan Rodgers was appointed as his replacement. They finished the season again in 9th place.

The 2019–2020 season started with the club picking up 38 points from their first 16 matches, which included a record eight game winning streak from 19 October to 8 December. On 25 October 2019, Leicester recorded a 0–9 away win at Southampton, the joint-largest win in Premier League history and the largest away win in English top flight history. In the same season, the club reached the semi-final stage of the EFL Cup but lost out to Aston Villa over two legs. Despite being in the top four for most of the season, Leicester suffered a drop-off in form at the end of the season, winning only two of their nine games following the resumption of league play due to the coronavirus pandemic. Three defeats in their last four matches saw them slide into 5th, the second highest Premier League finish in their history. This secured Leicester a place in the UEFA Europa League for the following season.

On 15 May 2021, Leicester won their first ever FA Cup having lost all four previous finals. They won 1–0 against Chelsea at Wembley Stadium, in front of a reduced crowd due to the Coronavirus pandemic. Months later at Wembley on 7 August 2021, Leicester won the FA Community Shield for the second time in the club's history. After finishing 5th again in the 2020–21 Premier League, Leicester qualified for the UEFA Europa League for the second consecutive year. In their 2021–22 UEFA Europa League campaign, Leicester were drawn against Napoli, Spartak Moscow and Legia Warsaw in Group C of the competition. They finished third and were transferred to the newly established UEFA Europa Conference League. Leicester went on to reach their first ever European semi-final in this competition against A.S. Roma, but were knocked out losing 2–1 on aggregate to the eventual winners. In the Premier League, the club finished in 8th place.

Helicopter crash 

On 27 October 2018, chairman Vichai Srivaddhanaprabha's helicopter crashed and malfunctioned outside King Power Stadium shortly after taking off from the pitch, following a home game against West Ham United F.C. There were five people on board the helicopter and no survivors. Following the crash, the club announced plans for a permanent memorial in the form of a statue. This was unveiled on 4 April 2022, which would have been Vichai's 64th birthday, and is located on the corner of Filbert Way and Raw Dykes Road.

Crest and colours

The club's traditional home colours of royal blue shirts, white shorts and either white or blue socks have been used for the team's kits throughout most of its history. In more recent times, the club have alternated between either white or blue shorts. 

"The Foxes" is the most common nickname for the club, and an image of a fox was first incorporated into the club crest in 1948. Since 1992, the club's badge has featured a fox's head overlaid onto a Cinquefoil; the Cinquefoil is similar to the one used on the coat of arms of Leicester. 

The club's move to their current stadium in 2002 prompted some changes to the crest, and the design has since evolved further. For the 2009–10 season, the club's 125th anniversary year, a special edition crest was worn on the home and away kits. For this season only, there was also a return to the initial away shirt of Leicester Fosse for the away kit, albeit with black shorts as opposed to the original white.

In 1941, the club adopted the playing of the Post Horn Galop at home games. Currently, for the first half of matches the tune is usually played live on the pitch, while a modern version of the tune is played over the PA system for the second half. "Foxes Never Quit" is the club's motto, with these words placed above the tunnel inside the stadium.

Kit suppliers and shirt sponsors

Since 2018, Leicester City's kit has been manufactured by German sportswear company Adidas. Previous manufacturers have included Bukta (1962–64, 1990–92), Admiral (1976–79, 1983–88), Umbro (1979–83), Scoreline (1988–90), Fox Leisure (1992–2000), Le Coq Sportif (2000–05), JJB (2005–07), Jako (2007–09), Joma (2009–10), Burrda (2010–12), and Puma (2012–18).

The club's current main shirt sponsor is FBS, an online trading platform. The first sponsorship logo to appear on a Leicester shirt was that of Ind Coope in 1983. British snack food manufacturer Walkers Crisps held a long association with the club, sponsoring their shirts from 1987 to 2001, and their stadium from 2002 to 2011. Other sponsors have included John Bull (1986–87), LG (2001–03), Alliance & Leicester (2003–07), Topps Tiles (2007–09), Jessops (2009–10), and Loros (2009–10). Siam Commercial Bank became the club's first sleeve sponsor, and the deal was valid for the 2017–18 season. Since the 2018–19 season, the sleeve sponsor has been Bia Saigon.

Stadium and training ground

In their early years, Leicester played at numerous grounds, but have only played at two since they joined the Football League. When first starting out, they played on a field by Fosse Road, hence the original club name Leicester Fosse. They moved from there to Victoria Park, and subsequently to Belgrave Road. Upon turning professional the club moved to Mill Lane. After eviction from Mill Lane the club played at the County Cricket ground while seeking a new ground. The club secured the use of an area of land by Filbert Street and moved there in 1891.

Some improvements by noted football architect Archibald Leitch occurred in the Edwardian era, and in 1927 a new two-tier stand was built, nicknamed "the Double Decker", which would persist until the ground's closure in 2002. With the exception of the addition of compulsory seating, the ground saw no further development until 1993, when the Main Stand was demolished and replaced by the new Carling Stand. The addition of the new stand, while the rest of the ground had been untouched since the 1920s, led manager Martin O'Neill to joke that he used to "lead new signings out backwards" so they only saw the Carling Stand.

The club moved away from Filbert Street in 2002 to a new 32,500 all-seater stadium. The site, located less than a mile away from the club's old home, was originally named the Walkers Stadium in a deal with food manufacturers Walkers. The first match hosted at the stadium was a 1–1 friendly draw against Athletic Bilbao, with Bilbao's Tiko being the first scorer at the stadium and Jordan Stewart being the first Leicester player to score. The first competitive match was a 2–0 victory against Watford. The stadium has since gone on to host England international matches, as well as the 2015 Rugby World Cup.

On 19 August 2010, it emerged that the new owners King Power wanted to rename the stadium King Power Stadium, and had plans to increase the capacity to 42,000 should Leicester secure promotion. On 5 July 2011, Leicester City confirmed the Walkers Stadium would now be known as King Power Stadium. In 2020, the club moved into a new state-of-the-art training complex in the Leicestershire village of Seagrave, described as having "some of the very best facilities in the world." The club's former training ground Belvoir Drive now serves as the training ground for Leicester City Women

Rivalries

Nottingham Forest are considered to be Leicester City's main rivals, while in North West Leicestershire Derby County are also considered to be rivals. Leicester additionally share a rivalry with Coventry City, in what is commonly known as the M69 derby, named after the M69 motorway which connects the two cities. Leicester were widely considered to be Forest’s main rivals prior to the mid 1970s. However, when Brian Clough was appointed as Forest manager in 1975, much to the dismay of Derby fans, the rivalry between Forest and Derby quickly intensified. Clough’s quick success at Forest, winning the 1977–78 First Division, followed by back-to-back European Cup wins in 1979 and 1980 only fuelled the rivalry further. As a result, both Forest and Derby fans now consider each other to be their fiercest rivals.

European record

Notes
LCFC goals listed first 
PR: Preliminary round
1R: First round
GS: Group stage
R32: Round of 32
R16: Round of 16
QF: Quarter-final
SF: Semi-final

Honours

Leicester City are currently one of five clubs including Manchester United, Manchester City, Chelsea and Liverpool to have won the Premier League, FA Cup and League Cup in the 21st century. Leicester are also one of 14 clubs to have won all four major domestic competitions in English football.

League
 First Division/Premier League
 Winners (1): 2015–16
 Runners-up (1): 1928–29
 Second Division/Championship
 Winners (7): 1924–25, 1936–37, 1953–54, 1956–57, 1970–71, 1979–80, 2013–14
 Play-off winners (2): 1993–94, 1995–96
 Third Division/League One
 Winners (1): 2008–09

Cups
 FA Cup
 Winners (1): 2020–21
 Runners-up (4): 1948–49, 1960–61, 1962–63, 1968–69
 League Cup
 Winners (3): 1963–64, 1996–97, 1999–2000
 Runners-up (2): 1964–65, 1998–99
 FA Charity Shield/FA Community Shield
 Winners (2): 1971, 2021
 Runners-up (1): 2016

Managerial history

Leicester City's current manager Brendan Rodgers is the club's 48th permanent manager. Nigel Pearson and Peter Hodge have both had two separate spells in charge of the club. Dave Bassett also had a second spell as caretaker manager after his spell as permanent manager. Up until Peter Hodge was hired after World War I, the club had no official manager. A nominal role of secretary/manager was employed, though the board and the selection committee took control of most team affairs. It was Hodge who instated a system at the club for the manager having complete control over player and staff recruitment, team selection and tactics. Though Hodge was originally also titled "secretary/manager" he has retrospectively been named as the club's first official "manager."

Records and statistics

Graham Cross holds the record for the most Leicester appearances, with the defender playing 600 games between 1960 and 1976, increased from 599 following the club's decision to incorporate the 1971 Charity Shield into official records. However, Adam Black holds the record for the most appearances in the league with 528 between 1920 and 1935.

Striker Arthur Chandler is currently the club's all-time record goal scorer, netting 273 in his 12 years at the club; he also found the net in 8 consecutive matches in the 1924–25 season. The most goals managed in a single season for the club is 44 by Arthur Rowley, in the 1956–57 season. The fastest goal in the club's history was scored by Matty Fryatt, when he netted after just nine seconds against Preston North End in April 2006.

Jamie Vardy broke the Premier League record for scoring 13 goals in 11 consecutive league games, in the 2015–16 Premier League season. Vardy is also the ninth player to score 20 top-flight goals in a season, following Arthur Chandler, Ernie Hine, Arthur Rowley, Jimmy Walsh, Ken Keyworth, Jackie Sinclair, Frank Worthington and Gary Lineker. Vardy's goal at Sunderland on 10 April 2016 saw him become the first player since Gary Lineker in 1984–85 to score 20 top flight goals for the club, having already become Leicester's highest Premier League scorer in a single season.

The record transfer fee paid by Leicester for a player was in the reigon of £32 to £40 million for midfielder Youri Tielemans from AS Monaco. The highest transfer fee received for a Leicester player was approximately £80 million from Manchester United for Harry Maguire; at the time of the transfer this was the eleventh highest ever fee, the highest ever move between two English teams and the highest ever for a defender. 

The club's record home attendance is 47,298, for a fifth round FA Cup match against Tottenham Hotspur at Filbert Street in 1928. The current record home attendance at King Power Stadium is understood to be 32,242, for a Premier League match against Sunderland F.C on 8 August 2015. The highest ever attendance for a non-competitive football match at King Power Stadium stands at 32,188, for a pre-season friendly against Real Madrid on 30 July 2011.

Leicester's highest ever league finish is first in the Premier League in 2015–16. Their lowest ever league finish was first in League One in 2008–09. Leicester are joint equal with Manchester City for having won the most English second tier titles (7). The club has appeared in five FA Cup finals, winning once in 2021.

Leicester's longest ever unbeaten run in the league was between 1 November 2008 and 7 March 2009, to which they remained unbeaten for 23 games on their way to the League One title. Their longest run of consecutive victories in league football is currently nine, which they achieved between 21 December 2013 and 1 February 2014 in the EFL Championship.

In the 2015–16 season, Leicester achieved many new historical, club records in what The Daily Telegraph described as "one of the most astonishing league titles of all-time." They recorded the fewest losses in any of the club's previous Premier League seasons, the fewest away defeats in any top flight season and the most consecutive wins in the top flight. Those consecutive victories came against Watford, Newcastle United, Crystal Palace, Southampton and Sunderland. Coincidentally, Leicester kept a record of five-straight clean sheets against each of the same five opponents. King Power Stadium's home crowds in 2015–16 saw their team beaten just once in the Premier League all season.

Leicester made their UEFA Champions League debut in the 2016–17 season, their fourth appearance in European football. The club became the third English team to win on their Champions League debut, after Manchester United in 1994 and Newcastle United in 1997. They also became the first English team to win away on their Champions League debut, and win all three of their opening games in the competition. Leicester are currently the first and only team in Champions League history to keep clean sheets in each of their opening four games in the competition. In March 2017, the club became the 50th team to reach the UEFA Champions League quarter-finals.

On 25 October 2019, Leicester City set the record for the highest margin of away victory in English top flight history, defeating Southampton 9–0 at St Mary's Stadium. In doing so they also tied the record for the highest margin of victory in Premier League history, equalling Manchester United's 9–0 home victory over Ipswich Town in 1995.  As a result, Leicester hold the all-time top tier records for biggest defeat, biggest away win, and highest scoring draw.

League history

Since their election to the Football League in 1894, Leicester have spent much of their history within the top two tiers of English football. Leicester have played outside the top two tiers only once in their history to date; during the 2008–09 season they played in League One, the third tier of English football, after relegation from the Championship the season prior. However, they made a swift return to the second tier, as they were promoted as champions in the 2008–09 season. The club have never played lower than England's third tier.

L1 = Level 1 of the football league system; L2 = Level 2 of the football league system; L3 = Level 3 of the football league system.
 Seasons spent at Level 1 of the football league system: 54
 Seasons spent at Level 2 of the football league system: 62
 Seasons spent at Level 3 of the football league system: 1
(up to and including 2021–22)

Players

First-team squad

Out on loan

Under-21s and Academy

Former players

Club staff

Player statistics

Captains

Player of the Year
Leicester City's Player of the Year award is voted for by the club's supporters at the end of every season.

English Hall of Fame members

The following have played for Leicester and have been inducted into the English Football Hall of Fame:
  Gordon Banks 2002 (Inaugural Inductee)
  Peter Shilton 2002 (Inaugural Inductee)
  Gary Lineker 2003
  Don Revie 2004 (Inducted as a manager)
  Frank McLintock 2009

Football League 100 Legends

The Football League 100 Legends is a list of "100 legendary football players" produced by The Football League in 1998, to celebrate the 100th season of League football. It also included Premier League players, and the following former Leicester City players were included:
  Arthur Rowley
  Gordon Banks
  Frank McLintock
  Peter Shilton
  Gary Lineker

World Cup players

The following players have been selected by their country in the World Cup Finals, while playing for Leicester. Players listed in bold are current Leicester City players.

  John Anderson (1954)
  Willie Cunningham (1958)
  Ken Leek (1958)
  Gordon Banks (1966) – Won the 1966 World Cup while at Leicester
  John O'Neill (1982, 1986)
  Paul Ramsey (1986)
  Gary McAllister (1990)
  David Kelly (1990)
  Matt Elliott (1998)
  Kasey Keller (1998)
  Muzzy Izzet (2002)
  Riyad Mahrez (2014)
  Kasper Schmeichel (2018)
  Harry Maguire (2018)
  Jamie Vardy (2018)
  Shinji Okazaki (2018)
  Wilfred Ndidi (2018) 
  Kelechi Iheanacho (2018)
  Ahmed Musa (2018)
  Adrien Silva (2018)
  Ricardo Pereira (2018)
  Yohan Benalouane (2018)
  Nampalys Mendy (2022)
  James Maddison (2022)
  Danny Ward (2022)
  Wout Faes (2022)
  Timothy Castagne (2022)
  Youri Tielemans (2022)
  Daniel Amartey (2022)

Continental competition players

The following players have been selected by their country in various continental tournaments, while playing for Leicester. Players listed in bold are current Leicester City players.

  Kasey Keller (1998 CONCACAF Gold Cup)
  Frank Sinclair (2000 CONCACAF Gold Cup)
  Muzzy Izzet (UEFA Euro 2000)
  Ian Walker (UEFA Euro 2004)
  Nikos Dabizas (UEFA Euro 2004)
  Mohammed Sylla (2006 Africa Cup of Nations)
  Iain Hume (2007 CONCACAF Gold Cup)
  Patrick Kisnorbo (2007 AFC Asian Cup)
  Hossein Kaebi (2007 AFC Asian Cup)
  John Paintsil (2012 Africa Cup of Nations)
  Sean St Ledger (UEFA Euro 2012)
  Kasper Schmeichel (UEFA Euro 2012, UEFA Euro 2020)
  Riyad Mahrez (2015 Africa Cup of Nations, 2017 Africa Cup of Nations)
  Wes Morgan (2015 CONCACAF Gold Cup)
  Andy King (UEFA Euro 2016)
  Christian Fuchs (UEFA Euro 2016)
  Jamie Vardy (UEFA Euro 2016)
  N'Golo Kanté (UEFA Euro 2016)
  Daniel Amartey (2017 Africa Cup of Nations, 2021 Africa Cup of Nations)
  Islam Slimani (2017 Africa Cup of Nations, 2019 Africa Cup of Nations)
  Wilfred Ndidi (2019 Africa Cup of Nations, 2021 Africa Cup of Nations)
  Çağlar Söyüncü (UEFA Euro 2020)
  Cengiz Ünder (UEFA Euro 2020)
  Danny Ward (UEFA Euro 2020)
  Dennis Praet (UEFA Euro 2020)
  Timothy Castagne (UEFA Euro 2020)
  Youri Tielemans (UEFA Euro 2020)
  Kelechi Iheanacho (2021 Africa Cup of Nations)
  Nampalys Mendy (2021 Africa Cup of Nations)

International honours

The following players have been selected by their country while playing for Leicester City (including players both on loan at, and away from the club). The number of caps won whilst at the club are given, along with the date of the first cap being won while with Leicester City. Players listed in bold are current Leicester City players.

  Alfred Watkins (2 Caps, 19 March 1898)
  Richard Jones (1 Cap, 19 March 1898)
  Mick Cochrane (1 Cap, 23 February 1901)
  Horace Bailey (5 Caps, 16 March 1908)
  Andy Aitken (3 Caps, 2 April 1910)
  Douglas McWhirter (4 Caps, 21 March 1913)
  Ronald Brebner (3 Caps, 15 November 1913)
  John Paterson (1 Cap, 10 April 1920)
  Mick O'Brien (3 Caps, 4 March 1922)
  John Duncan (1 Cap, 31 October 1925)
  Sid Bishop (4 Caps, 2 April 1927)
  Reg Osborne (1 Cap, 28 November 1927)
  Leonard Barry (5 Caps, 17 May 1928)
  Ernest Hine (6 Caps, 22 October 1928)
  Hugh Adcock (5 Caps, 9 May 1929)
  David Jones (7 Caps, 4 November 1933)
  Thomas Mills (1 Cap, 29 September 1934)
  Septimus Smith (1 Cap, 19 October 1935)
  William Maldwyn Griffiths (11 Caps, 16 April 1947)
  Tommy Godwin (5 Caps, 9 October 1949)
  Arthur Lever (1 Cap, 18 October 1952)
  John Anderson (1 Cap, 25 May 1954)
  Willie Cunningham (24 Caps, 3 November 1954)
  Kenneth Leek (16 Caps, 20 October 1960)
  Gordon Banks (35 Caps, 6 April 1963)
  David Gibson (7 Caps, 4 May 1963)
  Frank McLintock (3 Caps, 4 May 1963)
  Derek Dougan (8 Caps, 2 October 1965)
  Peter Rodrigues (16 Caps, 30 March 1966)
  Jackie Sinclair (1 Cap, 18 June 1966)
  Peter Shilton (20 Caps, 25 November 1970)
  Keith Weller (4 Caps, 11 May 1974)
  Frank Worthington (8 Caps, 15 May 1974)
  Stephen Whitworth (7 Caps, 12 March 1975)
  Joe Waters (1 Cap, 13 October 1976)
  John O'Neill (39 Caps, 26 March 1980)
  Gerry Daly (1 Cap, 22 September 1982)
  Paul Ramsey (14 Caps, 21 September 1983)
  Gary Lineker (7 Caps, 26 May 1984)
  Ian Wilson (2 Caps, 23 May 1987)
  Jari Rantanen (10 Caps, 9 September 1987)
  Robbie James (2 Caps, 9 September 1987)
  James Quinn (4 Caps, 14 September 1988)
  David Kelly (7 Caps, 25 April 1990)
  Gary McAllister (3 Caps, 25 April 1990)
  Brian Carey (1 Cap, 23 March 1994)
  Iwan Roberts (3 Caps, 20 April 1994)
  Colin Hill (16 Caps, 29 March 1995)
  Zeljko Kalac (2 Caps, 25 February 1996)
  Neil Lennon (29 Caps, 27 March 1996)
  Kasey Keller (21 Caps, 3 November 1996)
  Pontus Kåmark (17 Caps, 30 April 1997)
  Robbie Savage (20 Caps, 20 August 1997)
  Matt Elliott (18 Caps, 12 November 1997)
  Theodoros Zagorakis (18 Caps, 17 February 1998)
  Arnar Gunnlaugsson (3 Caps, 10 March 1999)
  Emile Heskey (5 Caps, 28 April 1999)
  Frank Sinclair (17 Caps, 26 May 1999)
  Steve Guppy (1 Cap, 10 October 1999)
  Gerry Taggart (6 Caps, 26 April 2000)
  Mustafa Izzet (8 Caps, 15 June 2000)
  Callum Davidson (5 Caps, 2 September 2000)
  Matt Jones (8 Caps, 24 March 2001)
  Trevor Benjamin (2 Caps (1 won while on loan to Gillingham), 20 November 2002)
  Keith Gillespie (9 Caps, 6 September 2003)
  Paul Dickov (5 Caps, 6 September 2003)
  Nikos Dabizas (6 Caps, 18 February 2004)
  Benjamin Thatcher (3 Caps, 31 March 2001)
  Danny Coyne (3 Caps, 31 March 2001)
  Peter Canero (1 Cap, 28 April 2004)
  Ian Walker (1 Cap, 5 June 2004)
  Joey Guðjónsson (6 Caps, 18 August 2004)
  Lars Hirschfeld (1 Cap, 26 March 2005)
  Alan Maybury (1 Cap, 29 March 2005)
  Danny Tiatto (1 Cap, 9 May 2005)
  Robert Douglas (1 Cap, 17 August 2005)
  Iain Hume (7 Caps, 16 November 2005)
  Mohammed Sylla (3 Caps, 7 January 2006)
  Elvis Hammond (1 Cap, 1 March 2006)
  Patrick Kisnorbo (3 Caps, 14 November 2006)
  Hossein Kaebi (2 Caps, 15 July 2007)
  Márton Fülöp (7 Caps (won while on loan from Sunderland), 22 August 2007)
  Radostin Kishishev (4 Caps (2 won while on loan at Leeds United), 22 August 2007)
  Gareth McAuley (4 Caps, 17 October 2007)
  Aleksander Tunchev (5 Caps, 6 September 2008)
  Andy King (50 Caps (3 won while on loan at Swansea City), 29 May 2009)
  Ryan McGivern (3 Caps (won while on loan from Manchester City), 14 October 2009)
  Yuki Abe (4 Caps, 8 October 2010)
  Greg Cunningham (1 Cap (won while on loan from Manchester City), 17 November 2010)
  Jeffrey Bruma (1 Cap (won while on loan from Chelsea), 7 June 2011)
  Sean St Ledger (19 Caps (3 won while on loan at Millwall), 10 August 2011)
  Gelson Fernandes (4 Caps (won while on loan from Saint-Étienne), 6 September 2011)
  John Paintsil (8 Caps, 5 November 2011)
  Souleymane Bamba (8 Caps, 12 November 2011)
  Jeffrey Schlupp (15 Caps, 15 November 2011)
  Kasper Schmeichel (84 Caps, 6 February 2013)
  Chris Wood (9 Caps (1 won while on loan at Ipswich Town), 22 March 2013)
  Jermaine Beckford (5 Caps (won while on loan at Huddersfield Town), 22 March 2013)
  Wes Morgan (30 Caps, 7 September 2013)
  Simonas Stankevičius (10 Caps, 18 November 2013)
  Márkó Futács (3 Caps (won while on loan at Diósgyőr), 5 March 2014)
  Riyad Mahrez (39 Caps, 31 May 2014)
  Harrison Panayiotou (12 Caps (5 won while on loan at Raith Rovers), 8 October 2014)
  Alie Sesay (3 Caps, 11 October 2014)
  Andrej Kramarić (10 Caps (5 won while on loan at 1899 Hoffenheim), 28 March 2015)
  Jamie Vardy (26 Caps, 7 June 2015)
  Shinji Okazaki (26 Caps, 3 September 2015)
  Christian Fuchs (11 Caps, 5 September 2015)
  Gökhan Inler (5 Caps, 8 September 2015)
  Tom Lawrence (6 Caps (2 won while on loan at Blackburn Rovers, 2 at Cardiff City and 2 at Ipswich Town), 13 October 2015)
  Daniel Amartey (40 Caps, 24 March 2016)
  N'Golo Kanté (8 Caps, 25 March 2016)
  Danny Drinkwater (3 Caps, 29 March 2016)
  Ahmed Musa (17 Caps (8 won while on loan at CSKA Moscow), 3 September 2016)
  Bartosz Kapustka (3 Caps, 4 September 2016)
  Islam Slimani (26 Caps (3 won while on loan at Newcastle United, 2 at Fenerbahçe and 5 at Monaco), 4 September 2016)
  Faiq Jefri Bolkiah (6 Caps, 15 October 2016)
  Wilfred Ndidi (42 Caps, 23 March 2017)
  Kelechi Iheanacho (33 Caps, 1 September 2017)
  Aleksandar Dragović (8 Caps (won while on loan from Bayer Leverkusen), 2 September 2017)
  Harry Maguire (20 Caps, 8 October 2017)
  Admiral Muskwe (4 Caps, 8 November 2017)
  Yohan Benalouane (5 Caps, 23 March 2018)
  Adrien Silva (6 Caps, 26 March 2018)
  George Thomas (3 Caps (2 won while on loan at Scunthorpe United), 29 May 2018)
  Ricardo Pereira (3 Caps, 30 June 2018)
  Çağlar Söyüncü (35 Caps, 7 September 2018)
  Jonny Evans (30 Caps, 8 September 2018)
  Rachid Ghezzal (6 Caps  (3 won while on loan at Beşiktaş), 8 September 2018)
  Ben Chilwell (11 Caps, 11 September 2018)
  Danny Ward (24 Caps, 20 November 2018)
  Youri Tielemans (39 Caps (4 won while on loan from Monaco), 21 March 2019)
  Filip Benković (1 Cap (won while on loan at Celtic), 11 June 2019)
  Dennis Praet (12 Caps (2 won while on loan at Torino), 6 September 2019)
  James Maddison (1 Cap, 14 November 2019)
  Timothy Castagne (22 Caps, 5 September 2020)
  Cengiz Ünder (11 Caps (won while on loan from Roma), 7 October 2020)
  Harvey Barnes (1 Cap, 8 October 2020)
  Nampalys Mendy (23 Caps, 26 March 2021)
  Thanawat Suengchitthawon (9 Caps, 29 May 2021)
  Patson Daka (7 Caps, 3 September 2021)
  Jannik Vestergaard (7 Caps, 9 October 2021)
  Ademola Lookman (4 Caps (won while on loan from RB Leipzig), 25 March 2022)
  James Justin (1 Cap, 4 June 2022)

Players with over 300 appearances for Leicester
Includes competitive appearances only. Current players in bold.

  Graham Cross 600
  Adam Black 557
  Kasper Schmeichel 479
  Hugh Adcock 460
  Mark Wallington 460
  Steve Walsh 450
  Arthur Chandler 419
  John Sjoberg 414
  Jamie Vardy 409
  Mal Griffiths 409
  Steve Whitworth 401
  Andy King 379
  Sep Smith 373
  Mike Stringfellow 370
  Richie Norman 365
  Gordon Banks 356
  John O'Neill 345
  Dave Gibson 339
  Peter Shilton 339
  Colin Appleton 333
  Dennis Rofe 324
  Wes Morgan 323
  Paul Ramsey 322
  Arthur Rowley 321
  Arthur Lochhead 320
  Muzzy Izzet 319
  Ian Wilson 318
  Derek Hines 317
  Lenny Glover 306

Players with 50 or more goals for Leicester
Includes competitive appearances only.
Current players in bold.

  Arthur Chandler 273
  Arthur Rowley 265
  Jamie Vardy 167
  Ernie Hine 156
  Derek Hines 117
  Arthur Lochhead 114
  Gary Lineker 103
  Mike Stringfellow 97
  Johnny Duncan 95
  Jimmy Walsh 91
  Jack Lee 84
  Alan Smith 84
  Frank Worthington 78
  Mal Griffiths 76
  Ken Keyworth 76
  Danny Liddle 71
  Arthur Maw 64
  Matty Fryatt 62
  Andy King 62
  Steve Walsh 62
  Steve Lynex 60
  David Nugent 59
  Fred Shinton 58
  Jack Bowers 56
  James Maddison 54
  Dave Gibson 53
  Jackie Sinclair 53
  Kelechi Iheanacho 52
  Hugh Adcock 52
  George Dewis 51
  Gary McAllister 51

Individual honours and awards 

Ballon d'Or nominees
The following players have been nominated for the Ballon d'Or while playing for Leicester, the award is also referred to as the World or European footballer of the year.
  Gordon Banks (1966)
  Jamie Vardy (2016)
  Riyad Mahrez (2016)

PFA Player of the Year
The following players have been named the PFA Player of the Year while playing for Leicester:
 2016 –  Riyad Mahrez

FWA Footballer of the Year
The following players have been named the FWA Footballer of the Year while playing for Leicester:
 2016 –  Jamie Vardy

English Golden Boot
The following players have won the English Golden Boot for being the country's top goalscorer, while at Leicester (note: This applies only to players playing in the top tier of English football):
  Gary Lineker (1984–85) (joint winner)
  Jamie Vardy (2019–20)

English Second Division Golden Boot
The following players have won the golden boot for being the top goalscorer in the second tier of English football while at Leicester:
  David Skea (1894–95)
  Arthur Chandler (1924–25)
  Jack Bowers (1936–37)
  Arthur Rowley (1952–53), (1956–57)
  Willie Gardiner (1955–56)
  Gary Lineker (1982–83)

Football League Awards Player of the Year
The following players have been named the best player in their division in the Football League Awards while at Leicester:
  Matty Fryatt (League One, 2009)

LMA Manager of the Year
The following managers have been named the LMA Manager of the Year or won their division award while at Leicester:
  Nigel Pearson (Championship, 2014)
  Claudio Ranieri (Overall, 2016; Premier League, 2016)

The Best FIFA Men's Player nominees
The following players have been shortlisted for The Best FIFA Men's Player award, while playing for Leicester:
  Jamie Vardy (2016)
  Riyad Mahrez (2016)

The Best FIFA Men's Coach
The following managers have been shortlisted and won, The Best FIFA Men's Coach award while managing Leicester:
  Claudio Ranieri (2016)

The Best FIFA Goalkeeper nominees
The following goalkeepers have been shortlisted for The Best FIFA Goalkeeper award, while playing for Leicester:
  Kasper Schmeichel (2018, 2021)

BBC Sports Personality Coach of the Year Award
  Claudio Ranieri (2016)

BBC Sports Personality Team of the Year Award
  Leicester City (2016)

ESPN Team of the Year
  Leicester City (2016)

Laureus World Sports Award
  Leicester City (2017)

FIFA FIFPro World11 nominees
The following players have been shortlisted for the FIFA FIFPro World11, while playing for Leicester:
  Jamie Vardy (2016)

PFA Team of the Year
The following players have been named in the PFA Team of the Year while at Leicester:
 1979 – Second Division –  Mark Wallington
 1982 – Second Division –  Mark Wallington
 1989 – Second Division –  Gary McAllister
 1990 – Second Division –  Gary McAllister
 1996 – First Division –  Garry Parker,  Steve Claridge
 2003 – First Division –  Muzzy Izzet,  Paul Dickov
 2009 – League One –  Jack Hobbs,  Matt Oakley,  Matty Fryatt
 2011 – Championship –  Kyle Naughton,  Andy King
 2013 – Championship –  Kasper Schmeichel,  Wes Morgan
 2014 – Championship –  Kasper Schmeichel,  Wes Morgan,  Danny Drinkwater
 2016 – Premier League –  Wes Morgan,  N'Golo Kanté,  Riyad Mahrez,  Jamie Vardy
 2020 – Premier League –  Çağlar Söyüncü,  Jamie Vardy

Notes

References

Further reading

 Dave Smith and Paul Taylor, Of Fossils and Foxes: The Official Definitive History of Leicester City Football Club (2001)
 Dave Smith and Paul Taylor, The Foxes Alphabet: Complete Who's Who of Leicester City Football Club (1995)
 Leicester City FC, The Official History of Leicester City Football Club DVD (2003) (Out of print)
 John Hutchinson, From Shed to Stadium: Illustrated history of LCFC. (2014) 
 John Hutchinson, Neil Plumb, Rob O'Donnell, Leicester City Classic Shirts 1949–2016 (2015)

External links

 
 
 BBC Leicester – In pictures: 125 years of Leicester City
 Leicester News

 
Football clubs in England
Premier League clubs
Former English Football League clubs
Sport in Leicester
Association football clubs established in 1884
EFL Cup winners
Midland Football League (1889)
EFL Championship clubs
1884 establishments in England
Football clubs in Leicestershire
Companies that have entered administration in the United Kingdom
FA Cup winners